Pyinsa is a former capital of Arakan from 818 to 1118. The former capital site is located north of Mrauk U, Rakhine State, Myanmar.

History 

The city was founded by Khittatin in 818 AD. After capital of Waithali was devastated by Pyu Invasion.

References

Bibliography
 

1018 establishments in Asia
1237 disestablishments in Asia